Glycine is an amino acid with the chemical formula .
 Glycine (data page)

Glycine may also refer to:

 Glycine (plant), a genus of plants in the bean family
 Glycine Watch SA, a Swiss watchmaker

See also
 Glycin, a photographic developing agent